Gonin is a surname. People with the surname include:

Alessio Gonin, Italian curler
Francesco Gonin (1808–1889), Italian painter, engraver and scenographer
Jules Gonin (1870–1935), Swiss ophthalmologist
Patrick Gonin (born 1957), French racing driver
René Gonin (born 1969), Swiss rower
Simone Gonin (born 1989), Italian curler

Surnames of French origin